Petter Wettre (born 11 August 1967) is a Norwegian Jazz musician (Saxophone) and composer, known from a number of album recordings, accompanied by receiving the Spellemannprisen two times.

Career 
Wettre was born and raised in Sandefjord. He studied music at the Toneheim Folk High School (1987), and later at the Berklee College of Music in Boston (1992), where he studied under the guidance of international Jazz Profiles like Dave Liebman and George Garzone. Moving back to Norway, he immediately formed his own Quartet with engagement at the Kongsberg Jazzfestival in 1993, followed by a Norway Tour in 1994. Eventually, he settled in Oslo and he distinguished himself at the Oslo Jazz Scenes with his own Trio and Quartet, and sat in with the "Storeslem" (Big Band) and "Sandefjord Big Band", toured with his own trio in Tribute to Ornette Coleman (1994), sat in with the band Time Out (1994–95), on tour with Øystein Sevåg's Global House (1995–96), Shirley Bassey (1995–96), played within the bands "Graffiti", "Horns for hire", Oslo Groove Company and Norske Store Orkester. Breakthrough as a jazz musician came with the representation of Norway at the EBU concert in Prague in 1995. He also appears on recordings with, among Others Torbjørn Sunde's Meridians (1998), Frode Alnæs's Frode (1996), the Element – Shaman (1999) and Oslo Groove Company – Anno (1996).

On the debut album Pig Virus (1996) with his Petter Wettre Quartet he was joined by Håvard Wiik (piano), Terje Gewelt (bass) and Per Oddvar Johansen (drums). Through "The Trio" (1995–2001) he has held a variety of co-operation with Jarle Vespestad (trommer), Per Oddvar Johansen (drums), Jon Christensen (drums) and Ingebrigt Håker Flaten (bass), Arild Andersen (bass) and Per Zanussi (bass). Lately he has had an extensive musical collaboration with the Danish Jazz musicians Jonas Westergaard (bass) and Anders Mogensen (drums) respectively in trio and quartet format. Today's edition of Petter Wettre Quartet  comprises Westergaard and Mogensen, respectively, bass and drums, as well as Erlend Slettevoll (piano). By some Events, Slettevoll is replaced by guitarist Kim Johannesen. Jonas Westergaard had a stay in New York where he sat in with Jazz sizes like George Garzone, Oliver Lake and Kresten Osgood.

Wettre runs the record label "Household Records" (from 2002), has given lectures Oslo musikkonservatorium and Agder Musikkonservatorium, and released Elvin Jones transcripts in the book Live at the lighthouse (2005). He was a nominee for the 2011 Spellemannprisen, this was his sixth nomination for this Award, an award he received for the album The only way to travel (2000) and for the album Fountain of Youth (2007). This time it was not for an album, but the duets with drummer Audun Kleive, only available as audio and video files, not released on any album.

Although most renown for the projects Petter Wettre Quartet and Petter Wettre Trio with numerous solid contributions to the jazz scene, he is also highly evaluated for the numerous meetings with international Jazz stars over the past few years. Giants as Dave Liebman, Joey DeFrancesco, Kenny Wheeler, Adam Nussbaum and Manu Katche do not decline an opportunity to cooperate with this important Norwegian profiled saxophonist. Wettre is the first choice when the French drummer Manu Katché seek a saxophone substitute for Jan Garbarek in the international Manu Katché Quintet.

This autumn Wettre will choose from the top shelf, when introducing himself to the Oslo Jazz audience, with a series of live concerts at the "Viktoria Nasjonale Jazzscene". First sprinkle star comes in the form of a duo with Jason Rebello, which Wettre tuned in with while sitting in with the Manu Katche Quartett. Labello is a permanent member of this quartet and known for collaboration with Star musicians like Sting, Peter Gabriel and Jan Garbarek. Wettre and Labello were united in musical unfolding again on stage on 18 October 2012 in Oslo.

Honors 
 2000: Spellemannprisen in the class Jazz
 2000: Kongsberg Jazz Award
 2007: Spellemannprisen in the class Jazz

Discography

Solo albums 
 1996: Pig virus (Curling Legs), quartet including Håvard Wiik, Terje Gewelt and Per Oddvar Johansen
 1998: Meet the Locals (Resonant), trio including Ingebrigt Håker Flaten and Jarle Vespestad
 2000: In Color (Resonant), with David Liebman, including with Ingebrigt Håker Flaten and Jarle Vespestad
 2000: The Only Way to Travel (Bergland), with Per Oddvar Johansen, awarded Spellemannprisen 2000 in the class Jazz
 2001: The Mystery Unfolds (Bergland), trio including Ingebrigt Håker Flaten and Jarle Vespestad
 2002: Household Name (Household), quartet including Wiik, Zanussi, Mogensen and Palle Pesonen
 2003: Live at Copenhagen Jazzhouse (Household), trio including Anders Christensen and Anders Mogensen
 2004: Tour De Force  (Household), with David Liebman, including with Ingebrigt Håker Flaten and Jarle Vespestad
 2004: Hallmark Moments (Household)
 2006: State of the Art (Household), with Kvintetten
 2006: Paramount (Household), solo
 2007: Fountain of Youth (Household) – was Awarded Spellemannprisen in the class Jazz
 2008: Appetite for Structure (Household)
 2008: Fountain of Youth Live!  (Household), with The Norwegian Radio Orchestra
 2011: The Only Way To Travel 2 (Household Records)
 2012: The Social Media Tapes (Household Records)
 2014: Playing Up to My Standards (Household), with Bjørn Vidar Solli, Erlend Slettevoll, Frode Berg and Adam Pache

Collaborations 
 1999: Shaman (Bergland), within 'Element', including with Gisle W. Johansen, Vidar Johansen, Håvard Wiik, Ingebrigt Håker Flaten and Paal Nilssen-Love
 2004: Dig It! (Nagel Heyer), with Frode Berg, featuring Petter Wettre, Roy Powell and Andreas Bye
 2005: Denada (ACT), with Helge Sunde & Norske Store Orkester, featuring Olga Konkova and Marilyn Mazur
 2010: The Red Album (Siddhartha Spiritual Music), with Øystein Sevåg Global House Band

References 

Bibliography
 Live at the lighthouse (2005) – Elvin Jones transkripts

Notes

External links 

 Biografi Petter Wettre – Store Norske Leksikon (in Norwegian)
 

Petter Wettre Quartet members
1967 births
20th-century Norwegian saxophonists
20th-century saxophonists
21st-century Norwegian saxophonists
Avant-garde jazz musicians
Berklee College of Music alumni
Curling Legs artists
Household Records artists
Living people
Musicians from Sandefjord
Norwegian jazz composers
Norwegian jazz saxophonists
Oslo Groove Company members
Resonant Music artists
Spellemannprisen winners